Intern Academy is a 2004 Canadian comedy film written and directed by Dave Thomas.  It has several alternative titles including working titles An Intern's Diary, Whitecoats and Interns.  In Canada, its English title is Intern Academy, while its French title is Médecin en herbe.  The US DVD title is White Coats.  Its Italian title is "L'ospedale piu' sexy del mondo," literally "The Sexiest Hospital in the World".

Plot
The story follows a group of interns and nurses working at St. Albert's, the worst teaching hospital in Canada, as they try to deal with work and relationship stress.

Run by administrator Dr. Cyrill Kipp, the hospital only manages to stay open because Kipp sells the hospital's equipment on the black market.

During on-the-job training headed by Dr. Omar Olson, interns brave blood, vomit and exploding colostomy bags. The students include the clumsy Mike Bonnert, whose parents Sam and Susan are prominent physicians and forced him to study in medical school; his girlfriend Mitzi Cole, who works as a stripper to pay her way through school; Dale Dodd, who has come to the hospital to meet women and falls in love with nurse Cynthia Skyes; Marlon Thomas, who likes to play pranks with his mates; Mira Towers, who aims to be a great surgeon; and the innocent Christine Lee, a very efficient student and promising doctor who loses her inhibitions when intoxicated.

After Mike discovers that Mitzi became sexually active with Dale, he, Dale, and Marlon begin to fight in the morgue, using human organs as weapons, but are caught and expelled from St. Albert's. However, when a 76-car pile up occurs, they return to ER to help the patients. One patient, who was saved in an emergency surgery, was a billionaire, and saves the hospital from going bankrupt.

Cast
Peter Oldring as Mike Bonnert
Pat Kelly as Dale Dodd
Viv Leacock as Marlon Thomas 
Ingrid Kavelaars as Mira Towers
Jane McLean as Christine Lee
Christine Chatelain as Mitzi Cole
Lynda Boyd as Cynthia Skyes
Carly Pope as Sarah Calder
Dave Foley as Dr. Denton Whiteside
Dave Thomas as Dr. Omar Olson
Dan Aykroyd as Dr. Cyrill Kipp
Maury Chaykin as Dr. Roger Anthony 'Tony' Toussant
Matt Frewer as Dr. Anton Keller
Saul Rubinek as Dr. Sam Bonnert
Sue Huff as Dr. Susan Bonnert
Rochelle Loewen as Buxom Nurse

DVD
The region 1 DVD was released July 25, 2006.
The region 2 DVD was released May 28, 2007.

See also
 Inglewood, Edmonton#Charles Camsell Hospital

External links

2004 films
2004 comedy films
Canadian comedy films
English-language Canadian films
Films shot in Edmonton
2000s English-language films
Films directed by Dave Thomas
2000s Canadian films